Lungi Mnganga-Gcabashe is a South African politician who represented the African National Congress (ANC) in the National Assembly from 2014 to 2019. In 2020 she was appointed chief of staff in the office of Pemmy Majodina, the Chief Whip of the Majority Party in the National Assembly. She was formerly a Member of the KwaZulu-Natal Provincial Legislature from 1999 to 2004 and chaired the KwaZulu-Natal branch of the ANC Women's League from 2008 to 2012. She was elected to five-year terms on the ANC's National Executive Committee in 2012 and 2022.

Early life and career 
Mnganga-Gcabashe is from KwaMashu in present-day KwaZulu-Natal province. During apartheid, she was active in the United Democratic Front (UDF) and the Natal Organisation of Women, a UDF affiliate. After the African National Congress (ANC) was unbanned in 1990, she joined the interim leadership corps of local ANC and ANC Women's League (ANCWL) structures in KwaMashu. Shortly afterwards, she was recruited to work full-time in the ANC's political organising department, a job she held for several years until her resignation in mid-1997. She subsequently worked for two years in local government administration in Pinetown. 

In the 1999 general election, Mnganga-Gcabashe was elected as a Member of the KwaZulu-Natal Legislature, representing the ANC, which at the time was a minority party in the legislature. During her five-year term in the legislature, she ascended the regional and provincial structures of the ANCWL; in the mid-2000s, she was elected Deputy Provincial Chairperson of the ANCWL in KwaZulu-Natal, deputising Nkosazana Dlamini-Zuma. By the end of 2008, she had succeeded Dlamini-Zuma as ANCWL Provincial Chairperson; her deputy was Dolly Shandu.

In March 2012, Mnganga-Gcabashe stood for a second term as ANCWL Provincial Chairperson but lost in a tense contest with Celiwe Madlopha. However, in May that year, she was elected to the Provincial Executive Committee of the ANC in KwaZulu-Natal; by number of votes received, she was ranked ninth of the 20 candidates elected to the committee. Then, in December, delegates to the ANC's 53rd National Conference elected Mnganga-Gcabashe to her first five-year term on the party's National Executive Committee; by number of votes received, she was ranked 16th of 80 candidates elected, receiving 1,695 votes from the roughly 4,500 voting delegates.

National Assembly: 2014–2019 
In the 2014 general election, Mnganga-Gcabashe was elected to an ANC seat in the National Assembly, the lower house of the South African Parliament; she was ranked fourth on the ANC's regional party list for KwaZulu-Natal. She served a single term in Parliament, departing after the next general election in 2019. For her first three years in Parliament, she served in the National Assembly's Portfolio Committee on Human Settlements and was the whip of the ANC's caucus in that committee. On 20 October 2017, the ANC announced that she would be transferred to chair the Portfolio Committee on Public Enterprises; the ANC caucus formally elected her to that position on 25 October. She succeeded Dipuo Letsatsi-Duba, who had left the committee to become Deputy Minister of Public Service and Administration, and she entered the position amid a high-profile parliamentary inquiry into alleged maladministration at Eskom. 

Mnganga-Gcabashe was not re-elected to the ANC National Executive Committee in 2017, but she retained the parliamentary chairmanship until 2019, when she did not seek re-election to Parliament. In June 2020, the ANC announced that she had been appointed chief of staff in the office of Pemmy Majodina, the Chief Whip of the Majority Party in the National Assembly. She was elected to a second five-year term on the ANC's National Executive Committee at the party's 55th National Conference in December 2022; by popularity, she was ranked 64th of the 80 candidates elected, receiving 1,091 votes across the 4,029 ballots cast in total.

Personal life 
Mnganga-Gcabashe is divorced from Sipho Gcabashe, a businessman and ANC politician.

References

External link 

 

Living people
People from KwaMashu
21st-century South African women politicians
21st-century South African politicians
Members of the National Assembly of South Africa
African National Congress politicians
Members of the KwaZulu-Natal Legislature
Year of birth missing (living people)